Who Are You, Polly Maggoo? is a 1966 French film directed by William Klein.

It is a satirical arthouse mockumentary spoofing the fashion world and its excesses. It stars Dorothy McGowan as Polly Maggoo, an American supermodel who is being followed by a French television crew, and Grayson Hall as Miss Maxwell, a fashion-magazine editor modeled after Diana Vreeland, and Philippe Noiret as the TV reporter and director. Also appearing are Jean Rochefort, Sami Frey, and Alice Sapritch.

McGowan was an American model prior to the film; she modeled for Vogue and Harper's Bazaar.
After the release of the film, McGowan's first and only, she disappeared from public view and apparently neither acted nor modeled again, according to Klein.

References

External links
 
 
 Who Are You, Polly Maggoo? at Sundance Channel

French avant-garde and experimental films
1966 films
French black-and-white films
1960s French-language films
1966 comedy films
Films directed by William Klein
Films about fashion
Films scored by Michel Legrand
1960s avant-garde and experimental films
1966 directorial debut films
1960s French films